Universidad San Anselmo de Canterbury (Saint Anselm of Canterbury University) is an official seminary of the Episcopal Anglican Church of Chile. The university develops its academic work for Anglo Catholic churches with traditional Anglican beliefs. It offers various degree programs taught in Spanish, in three facilities.

Degrees and postgraduate degrees are accredited by the St. Alcuin House in Blaine, Minnesota, United States.

Degrees Offered 

Theology
 Bachelor of Theology (Bachillerato en Teología), Th.B.
 Licentiate in Theology(Licenciatura en Teología)
 Master of Theology (Magister en Teología), Th.M.
 Doctor of Theology(Doctorado en Teología), Th.D.
 Graduate Diploma in Theology(Diplomado en Teología)
 Graduate Diploma in Anglican Theology (Diplomado en Teología Anglicana)

Philosophy
 Graduate Diploma in Philosophy (Diplomado en Filosofía)
 Doctor of Philosophy (Doctorado en Filosofía), Ph.D.

Bible Studies
 Graduate Diploma in Sacred Scripture (Diplomado en Sagrada Escritura)
 Graduate Diploma in Old Testament (Diplomado en Antiguo Testamento)
 Graduate Diploma in New Testament (Diplomado en Nuevo Testamento)

Universities in Chile
Anglo-Catholic educational establishments